Keith Ridgway (born 2 October 1965) is an Irish novelist. An author, he has been described as "a worthy inheritor" of "the modernist tradition in Irish fiction."

Writings
Horses, Ridgway's first published work of fiction, appeared in Faber First Fictions Volume 13 in 1997. In 1998 The Long Falling was published by Faber & Faber, London. It was adapted into a film by French director Martin Provost in 2011: Où va la nuit. A collection of short fiction, Standard Time, appeared in 2000, followed by Ridgway's third novel, The Parts, in 2003. Both were published by Faber & Faber. In 2006 Animals was published by 4th Estate, London. A short story, "Goo Book," was published in the April 11, 2011, issue of The New Yorker magazine. Hawthorn & Child, was published by New Directions on 2013. 
His first novel in eight years, A Shock, was published by Picador in June 2021.
Ridgway's novels have been translated into several languages and have been published in France, Italy, and Germany.

Awards
Keith Ridgway was awarded the Rooney Prize for Irish Literature in 2001. That same year The Long Falling received the Prix Femina Étranger (translated as "Mauvaise Pente"). Ridgway's short story "Rothko Eggs" won the O. Henry Award in 2012 and was anthologized in the PEN/O. Henry Prize Stories that year.

References

External links
Keith Ridgway on "Goo Book" in The New Yorker Blog: Book Bench
Entry at Irish Writers On Line
Keith Ridgway on Twitter
 Keith Ridgway at New Directions

1965 births
Living people
Irish gay writers
Irish expatriates in the United Kingdom
Irish male short story writers
Irish male novelists
Writers from Dublin (city)
Prix Femina Étranger winners
21st-century Irish male writers
Irish LGBT novelists
21st-century Irish short story writers
21st-century Irish novelists